Ngonidzashe Makusha (born 11 March 1987) is a Zimbabwean sprinter and long jumper. He is the national record holder over 100 m and Long Jump for Zimbabwe with 9.89 s (+1.3 m/s) and 8.40 m (0.0 m/s) respectively. Both performances achieved during the 2011 NCAA Division I Championships in Des Moines, Iowa where he completed the 100 m long jump double. Following the 2 gold medals victory, Makusha became one of the only four, now five, athletes to win the double (100 m & Long Jump) at the NCAA championships. The four others are DeHart Hubbard (1925), Jesse Owens (1935 & 1936), Carl Lewis (1981), and Jarrion Lawson (2016).

In 2011, Makusha was named the men's winner of The Bowerman which is awarded to the top collegiate track & field athlete of the year.

Early career
He started his career in Seke, Mandedza high School, Zimbabwe .In July 2006 in Windhoek, Makusha achieved decent results in several events. In addition to 7.87 metres in the long jump, he jumped 14.90 metres in the triple jump, ran the 100 metres in 10.64 seconds and the 200 metres in 21.57 seconds. The next month he entered in both long jump and the 100 metres at the 2006 World Junior Championships. In the 100 metres, he reached the semi-final, where he was knocked out with a time of 10.84 seconds. He reached the final in the long jump event, but finished twelfth and last. The next year he competed at the 2007 All-Africa Games, where he won a bronze medal in the 4 x 100 metres relay, together with his teammates Gabriel Mvumvure, Brian Dzingai and Lewis Banda. He also competed in long jump and 100 metres, achieving 7.69 metres and 10.52 seconds in the two events.

International breakthrough
For the 2007–08 indoor season, he enrolled at the Florida State University. He quickly improved his long jumping, recording 7.97 metres in March in Fayetteville. In May 2008 he finally broke the eight metre barrier, setting a new Zimbabwean record of 8.16 metres in Tallahassee, Florida. The next month he won the NCAA Championships held in Des Moines, Iowa. The freshman did so with another Zimbabwean record, this time with 8.30 metres. He commented that "This is one of my dreams and it just came true". The victory was the first in any individual event at the NCAA championships for the Florida State University. It was also the best mark for the university as well as a stadium record.

Makusha then represented Zimbabwe at the 2008 Summer Olympics in Beijing. In the long jump competition he secured a place in the final round with his first qualifying jump, which measured 8.14 metres. In the final round his first jump measured 8.19 metres. With this he was in the lead until the third round, when Irving Saladino jumped 8.21 metres. Makusha did not improve further, and was overtaken by Godfrey Khotso Mokoena and Ibrahim Camejo, who leapt 8.24 and 8.20 respectively.
He thus finished fourth, while Saladino won the event with 8.34 metres.

The 2008–09 indoor season saw Makusha achieving a personal best time in the 60 metres, running in 6.68 seconds in January in Blacksburg. In February in the same city, he improved this to 6.60 seconds. He also jumped a national indoor record of 8.21 metres.

References

External links

Florida State Seminoles bio

1987 births
Living people
Sportspeople from Mashonaland East Province
Zimbabwean long jumpers
Alumni of Churchill School (Harare)
Athletes (track and field) at the 2008 Summer Olympics
Olympic athletes of Zimbabwe
Florida State Seminoles men's track and field athletes
Zimbabwean expatriates in the United States
World Athletics Championships medalists
World Athletics Championships athletes for Zimbabwe
Zimbabwean male sprinters
Male long jumpers
African Games bronze medalists for Zimbabwe
African Games medalists in athletics (track and field)
Athletes (track and field) at the 2007 All-Africa Games